Robert Samuel Battiscombe (13 April 1799 – 13 March 1881) was an English first-class cricketer associated with Cambridge University who was active in the 1820s. He is recorded in two matches from 1819 to 1821, totalling 29 runs with a highest score of 17.

Battiscombe was born at Clewer in Berkshire and educated at Eton College and King's College, Cambridge. He was admitted to the Bar as a lawyer in 1827, but later became a Church of England clergyman, serving as vicar of Holy Trinity Brompton, London, from 1835 to 1840 and Barkway with Reed, Hertfordshire, from 1840 to his death in 1881 aged 81.

References

English cricketers
English cricketers of 1787 to 1825
Cambridge University cricketers
1799 births
1881 deaths
People from Windsor, Berkshire
People from Barkway
People educated at Eton College
Alumni of King's College, Cambridge
19th-century English Anglican priests